The comp.* hierarchy is a major class of newsgroups in Usenet, containing all newsgroups whose name begins with "comp.", organized hierarchically.

comp.* groups discuss various computer, technology, and programming issues.  Some groups can even offer peer-to-peer technical support.

Partial list of comp.* groups

Historical groups

See also
 List of newsgroups

External links
 Google Groups contains a complete browsable list of groups
 Directory of the comp.* hierarchy at Giganews

Computer-related introductions in 1987
Big 8 (Usenet)